Asif Khan (born 4 December 1992) is an Indian cricketer. He made his List A debut for Jammu & Kashmir in the 2018–19 Vijay Hazare Trophy on 1 October 2018.

References

External links
 

1992 births
Living people
Indian cricketers
Jammu and Kashmir cricketers
Place of birth missing (living people)